The Main Deli Steak House, also known simply as Main Deli, is a delicatessen and steakhouse located in Montreal, Quebec. The restaurant was established in 1974 by Peter Varvaro and currently located on Saint Laurent Boulevard right across the street from their main business rival, the famed Schwartz's Montreal Hebrew Delicatessen. The two restaurants are often compared against each other in their patronage and the flavours of their Montreal-style smoked meat.

Varvaro is Italian in background, but grew up immersed in the Jewish language and culture. The deli remains a family business, and two of Varvaro's children have opened their own smoked meat restaurants in the suburbs of Montreal. Some of the regular clients of the Main Deli in the past included Stanley Lewis and Leonard Cohen, as well as Céline Dion, who has gone on to become their competition as one of the owners of Schwartz's.

Offerings
The Main Deli's main offering is smoked meat, which they cure and smoke in the back of their restaurant. Whole beef briskets are cured with brine and their own spice mix consisting of black pepper, garlic, coriander, mustard seed, and other ingredients found in Montreal steak seasonings. The meat is then smoked in a smoking oven and steamed to completion. Peter Varvaro, the owner and maker of the smoked meat at the Main Deli, indicates that while the spice mixture is important, it's the method of smoking and cooking the meat that contributes to its flavours and textures.

The restaurant is also well known for their smoked meat poutine and smoked meat burger.

See also

 List of delicatessens

References

External links
Main Deli webpage

1974 establishments in Quebec
Jewish delicatessens in Canada
Jews and Judaism in Montreal
Montreal cuisine
Restaurants established in 1974
Restaurants in Montreal
Steakhouses